Alejandro César Curbelo Aguete (born 19 September 1973 in Montevideo) is a former Uruguayan footballer.

International career
Curbelo made three appearances for the senior Uruguay national football team at the 2001 Copa América.

References

1973 births
Living people
Uruguayan footballers
Uruguay international footballers
2001 Copa América players
Miramar Misiones players
Central Español players
Montevideo Wanderers F.C. players
Club Nacional de Football players
Defensor Sporting players
Racing Club de Montevideo players
Footballers from Montevideo
Alianza F.C. footballers
Expatriate footballers in El Salvador
Association football defenders